Juan Pedro Lier (born 24 December 1938) is an Argentine rower. He competed in the men's coxed pair event at the 1964 Summer Olympics.

References

1938 births
Living people
Argentine male rowers
Olympic rowers of Argentina
Rowers at the 1964 Summer Olympics
Place of birth missing (living people)
Pan American Games medalists in rowing
Pan American Games silver medalists for Argentina
Pan American Games bronze medalists for Argentina
Rowers at the 1959 Pan American Games
Rowers at the 1963 Pan American Games